Moms is the fifth studio album from the band Menomena.  It was released on September 18, 2012.

Background
Following the release of their 2010 album Mines, member Brent Knopf left the group to focus on solo project Ramona Falls.  Remaining members Danny Seim and Justin Harris continued on as a two piece.  Seim and Harris planned their next album to deal with the topic of mothers; Seim's mother had died when he was young, and Harris was raised largely by a single mother.

Compared to the process of recording Mines, which was "gruelling" according to Seim, the Moms sessions were "our most collaborative and peaceful".

Reception
The album received generally favorable reviews in music publications. On Metacritic, it received an 81/100 based on 23 reviews indicating "universal acclaim". Pitchfork Media gave the album an eight out of ten rating and commented that the album was "the most aggressive record Menomena have ever made".  Allmusic felt the maternal theme was a "unifying" element and appreciated the album's "emotional depth". The album peaked at #150 on the Billboard 200 chart and at #32 on the Independent Albums chart.

Track listing

Personnel
Menomena
 Justin Harris
 Danny Seim

References

Menomena albums
Barsuk Records albums
2012 albums